The women's 1500 metres event at the 2002 African Championships in Athletics was held in Radès, Tunisia on August 10.

Results

References

2002 African Championships in Athletics
1500 metres at the African Championships in Athletics
2002 in women's athletics